Edith González Fuentes (10 December 1964 – 13 June 2019) was a Mexican actress. She is best remembered for working on multiple telenovelas produced by three different multimedia companies, which included Televisa, TV Azteca and Telemundo.

González made her acting debut on the telenovela produced by Televisa Cosa juzgada in 1970. She would later start a prominent career on multiple telenovelas produced by the same company, with her most famous works including Los ricos también lloran (1979–1980), Bianca Vidal (1982–1983), Corazón salvaje (1993–1994), Salomé (2001–2002), Mundo de fieras (2006–2007), Palabra de mujer (2007–2008) and Camaleones (2009–2010). In 2011, she moved to TV Azteca, the second best-known multimedia company in Mexico, where she starred in the telenovelas Cielo rojo (2011–2012), Vivir a destiempo (2013) and Las Bravo (2014–2015).

She also starred in the telenovelas produced by Telemundo Doña Bárbara (2008–2009) and Eva la Trailera in 2016, with the latter being her last leading acting role. Her last televised work was in 2019 as judge on the fashion program produced by TV Azteca, Este es mi estilo.

In film, she made her debut in the television film Un cuento de Navidad (1974). Beginning in films, she had little roles as an uncredited or extra actress in movies such as Alucarda, la hija de las tinieblas (1977), Cyclone (1978) and Guyana: Crime of the Century (1979). Continuing her career in films her most famous works included Trampa Infernal (1989), Salón México (1996), Señorita Justice (2004),  Poquita Ropa (2011) and Deseo (2013).

As well as being actress of television and films, she also participated on plays such as Aventurera (theatrical adaptation of the film with the same name) produced by Carmen Salinas. For her work as an actress in films and telenovelas, she was nominated and awarded with prizes such as the Diosas de Plata and Heraldo de México.

Life and career

1964–1981: Childhood and child actress 
González was born on 10 December 1964 in Mexico City, though other sources have said she was born in Monterrey. She participated in school plays since her childhood and studied acting in New York, London and Paris. She was part of the academy of theater director Lee Strasberg, as well as studying at the Neighborhood Playhouse and the Actors Institute. González was also part of the Sorbonne University, where she studied English and art history, and jazz in Great Britain. Aged 5 and during a visit to the Siempre en Domingo program, she was chosen by the public to play a role with actor Rafael Baledón. From then on she appeared as a child actress in several films and TV series from the 70s. According to IMDb, her first acting credit role was on the 1970 telenovela produced by Televisa, Cosa juzgada. Her early papers on telenovelas included on Lucía Sombra (1971), La maldición de la blonda (1971), El amor tiene cara de mujer (1971), El edificio de enfrente (1972), Mi primer amor (1973), Los miserables (1973), for which she was awarded in 1974 with an Heraldo award in the category of "revelation artist" and Lo imperdonable (1975).

She made her film debut in 1974 on the television film Canción de Navidad. Following this, some of her early films included El rey de los gorilas (1977), Alucarda, la hija de las tinieblas (1977), Cyclone (1978), Guyana: Crime of the Century (1979), Fabricantes de pánico (1980) and Cosa fácil (1982).

González would continued working in multiple telenovelas produced by Televisa. At the age of 15, she had her first important paper on television participating on the telenovela Los ricos también lloran of 1979 sharing credits with Verónica Castro and Rogelio Guerra, and in which she also met and acted along Christian Bach with whom she had a longtime friendship until Bach's death. As a teenager, her works in telenovelas included Ambición (1980), Soledad (1980), in which she shared credits with Libertad Lamarque and El hogar que yo robé (1981), in which she shared credits with Angélica María.

1982–1989: Transition to adult roles 
In 1982, González had her first leading role in the telenovela Bianca Vidaland the same year she also appeared on the telenovela Chispita. The next year in 1983, she participated on the telenovela La fiera. In 1984, she appeared on the film Adiós Lagunilla, adiós and had another leading role in the telenovela Sí, mi amor (TV series)Sí, mi amor. In 1986, she appeared on the anthology series La hora marcada as well as appearing on the telenovelas Monte Calvario, in which she had the leading role and Lista negra. In 1987 she made an appearance as herself on the program Papá soltero and had her first villain role on the telenovela Rosa salvaje, she participated in this project until episode 48 and at the time several versions for her exit were woven. It was said that she had been fired, but in the words of González herself, she actually resigned because of the alleged mistreatment she received from the production of the series.

In an interview, González defended her version of the events, explaining that at that moment in her career she could not afford an antagonistic role after having starred in other fictions. In her opinion, she was not going to endure any "humiliation" stating the following:

The actress also pointed out that during the filming she experienced "unpleasant experiences" and denounced that she was not treated properly, so she decided to give up the series. González assured that she was not fired for the production by stating:

In an infamous scene of the telenovela, the lead character Rosa García (played by Verónica Castro) throws noodles to her face, which was reported to be for many fans a symbol of the "humiliation" described by González. Her character was replaced by Felicia Mercado. In 1988 she participated on the films Pero sigo siendo el rey and Central camionera while she also returned to the telenovelas on Flor y canela. She acted on the horror film Trampa Infernal (1989), sharing credits with Pedro Fernández.

1990–2009: High-profile actress in Televisa 
In 1990, González was part of the films El motel de la muerte, Sentencia de muerte and Atrapados. This same year, she had the leading role on the telenovela En carne propia. Her filmography continued in 1991 with the films El muerto, El jugador and El descuartizador. In 1993, she starred on the telenovela Corazón salvaje along with Eduardo Palomo, who died in 2003 due to a heart attack. This same year, she appeared on the episode "La heredera" (Spanish for, "The heiress") of the program Videoteatros: Véngan corriendo que les tengo un muerto as well as appearing on the program Televiteatros. She appeared on the film Los cómplices del infierno (1995), in which she shared credits with Maribel Guardia and Alfredo Adame. In 1995 and 1996 and under various roles, González made appearances for the anthology telenovela Mujer, Casos de la Vida Real, hosted by Golden Age of Mexican cinema actress, Silvia Pinal. In 1996, she had the lead role on the telenovela La sombra del otro. She also appeared on the film Salón México (1996). In 1997, she had another leading role on the telenovela La jaula de oro, sharing credits with Saúl Lisazo and René Casados.

In 1998, González participated on the play Aventurera produced by actress Carmen Salinas, this was the play depiction of the 1950 film of the same name. On the play she had the leading role and was the first to portrayed Elena Tejero (the main character), as well as being recognized by Salinas, the producer, as the best "Aventurera" for the play, even though after González, there were other portrayers for the leading role, such as Niurka Marcos, Ninel Conde, Susana González, among other more actresses. In 1999, she had the leading role in the telenovela Nunca te olvidaré, sharing credits with actor Fernando Colunga and also had a role on the telenovela Cuento de Navidad.

Returning to films in 2000, she took part on the short film Rogelio. In 2001, she had the leading role on the telenovela Salomé, sharing credits with María Rubio, Guy Ecker and Niurka Marcos. In 2002, she appeared on the comedy program XHDRbZ. In 2003, she made a special appearance on the program La hora pico. In 2004, she starred in the telenovela Mujer de madera, by producer Emilio Larrosa, but had to stop working that same year due to becoming pregnant. She was replaced by Ana Patricia Rojo in the production. Her next film role was in the movie Señorita Justice (2004), a rare English-language role in which she shared credits with Eva Longoria which was filmed on location in Miami, Florida. Returning to telenovelas in 2006, she took an antagonist role in the telenovela Mundo de fieras, of producer Salvador Mejía, where she shared credits with César Évora and Gaby Espino. This same year, she had another guest appearance on the program La hora pico. In 2007, she had a guest role on the black comedy program La familia P. Luche, in which she shared credits with Eugenio Derbez and Consuelo Duval. This same year, she had another leading role in the telenovela Palabra de mujer and also traveled to Romania for an acting role in the telenovela Inimă de țigan. In 2008, she traveled to Colombia to play the role of Bárbara Guaimarán in Doña Bárbara, based on the Venezuelan novel of the same name written by Rómulo Gallegos, acting alongside Christian Meier and produced by Telemundo. And this same year, she also made an appearance on a Plaza Sesamo short film entitled Plaza Sésamo: Los monstruos feos más bellos (Sesame Square: The most beautiful ugly monsters). In 2009, she appeared with a role on the psychological thriller series Mujeres asesinas and this same year, she also had a co-leading role on the telenovela Camaleones, with this marking her last telenovela on the channel.

2010–2019: TV Azteca and final works 
In 2010, González switched to TV Azteca, the second main Mexican broadcaster. She made her first appearance for the company during a program of the 2010 edition of la Academia La Academia Bicentenario. This same year, she appeared during the Mañanitas a la Virgen program, a special yearly transmission done by TV Azteca on December 12, in which different artists sing at the Basilica of Our Lady of Guadalupe in honor of Our Lady of Guadalupe celebration day.

In 2011, she had her first leading role for the company on the telenovela Cielo rojo by Eric Vonn, sharing credits with Regina Torné and Mauricio Islas. She also returned to films on the television film Poquita ropa (2011), starred by singer Ricardo Arjona. This same year, she also had a special role on the telenovela A corazón abierto and led the Mañanitas a la Virgen program. In 2013, she had another leading role on the telenovela Vivir a destiempo, in which she shared credits with Humberto Zurita. This year, she also co-produced and acted in the film Deseo along with her longtime friend Christian Bach. In 2014, she had the leading role on the telenovela Las Bravo, in which she shared credits one more time with actor Mauricio Islas.

In 2016, she returned with the leading role on the telenovela produced by Telemundo, Eva la trailera. The telenovela and Telemundo were sued by Rolando Fernández, who accused them of plagiarism of his 1983 film Lola the Truck Driver. The lawsuit was ultimately won by Fernández. Despite this, the telenovela was retransmitted by Telemundo in 2019 following González's death as a tribute in her memory.

In 2017, she played a recurring role on the telenovela 3 familias, and appeared on the annual Mañanitas a la Virgen program. In 2019, González filmed her last film entitled Un sentimiento honesto en el calabozo del olvido, and served as a judge on the first season of fashion reality show Este es mi Estilo, with this being her last work and final television project.

Theater 
As well as being an actress for multiple films and television productions, González was also an actress of multiple plays such as Los árboles mueren de pie, Un día particular, Magnolias de acero, Buenas noches mamá, Entre mujeres, among others. Her most famous theater work was in the play Aventurera produced by Carmen Salinas for which she was the first actress to portray the lead character, Elena Tejero.

Personal life 
González had a daughter, Constanza (born 17 August 2004). Initially she did not disclose the father's name and decided to raise Constanza alone. In 2008, Mexican politician Santiago Creel recognized that he was Constanza's father. During an interview in August 2012, González shared that she had lost a baby previously without any further explanation by simply stating the following:

In 2010, González married Lorenzo Lazo Margáin. She was longtime friends with Argentine-Mexican actress Christian Bach, who died on February 26, 2019, due to respiratory failure. As an actress in TV Azteca, she is noted for being adverse to doing bed scenes, asking for a body double to replace her in sex scenes.

Illness and death 

In 2016, González was diagnosed with stage IV ovarian cancer. She underwent surgery to have her ovaries, uterus and lymph nodes removed, and, in the words of the actress herself, she had overcome the cancer. In April 2019, it was rumored that she had suffered a cancer relapse; which the actress denied, adducing a trip to Guatemala.

On 13 June 2019, González died of the disease. She was declared medically brain dead and was later taken off life support by her family at noon, passing away at the age of 54. Hours before her death, the Mexican television daily morning program Hoy erroneously reported that she had already died, which was wrong since González's official hour of death was at 12:00 p.m. when her family decided to disconnect her, with this incident causing annoyance to her family. Also on 13 June, González's funeral was held at the Panteón Francés where she was accompanied by her family and famous colleagues of her acting career. On 14 June, her body was moved to the Jorge Negrete theatre where a tribute was held for her with the attendance of fans, friends and family. After the tribute, she was moved to the Parque Memorial Gayosso in Naucalpan de Juárez, where she was buried alongside her father.

Filmography

Film

Telenovelas

Television

Awards and nominations

Diosas de Plata awards

Heraldo de México awards

People en Español awards

TVyNovelas awards

References

External links

1964 births
2019 deaths
20th-century Mexican actresses
21st-century Mexican actresses
Actresses from Monterrey
Deaths from cancer in Mexico
Deaths from ovarian cancer
Lee Strasberg Theatre and Film Institute alumni
Mexican child actresses
Mexican telenovela actresses
Mexican television actresses
Mexican film actresses
Mexican stage actresses